Bárbara Tinoco (born 16 November 1998) is a Portuguese singer and songwriter. She became known for her participation in the reality singing competition The Voice Portugal, in 2018. Two years later, she reached 2nd place at the Festival RTP da Canção. In 2021, she won the Golden Globe for Best Performer.

Early life
Tinoco started learning guitar at home with her father. Despite not being a professional musician, she had inherited the family business, a musical instrument store, where Barbara spent many hours as a child. Her first instrument was a ukulele, given to her by her grandfather. She has two younger sisters and her mother is an accountant. She enrolled at the Faculty of Social and Human Sciences, but it was in a masterclass given by João Gil for Antena 1 that she began to consider a path in music more seriously.

Musical career
Tinoco took her first step towards stardom in 2018 when she decided to participate in the reality singing competition The Voice Portugal. During the Blind Audition, she sang a version of Jolene by Dolly Parton, but could not get any of the judges to turn their chairs. However, she was eventually challenged to sing one of her original themes. Composed by Tinoco when she was only 16 years old, "Antes Dela Dizer Que Sim" became a viral success, becoming her debut single, released the following year. Following her participation in the television program, Tinoco was approached by Pedro Barbosa, manager of artists such as Miguel Araújo and The Black Mamba, and it was from there that she turned professional. In 2019, she assured the first parts of the João Só tour concerts. In 2020, she was considered the Breakthrough Artist at PLAY - Portuguese Music Awards.

Tinoco participated in the RTP da Canção Festival in 2020, alongside Tiago Nacarato, who wrote and composed the contest theme, "Passe-Partout". The theme won the public vote, but the final result placed Elisa as the winner. Tinoco's interpretation reached 18 points, two less than the winning theme. In 2021, she released the first extended records. Published in April, Desalinhados is an EP of collaborations in which each theme has a different guest: António Zambujo, Carolina Deslandes, Diana Martinez, Tyoz, Bárbara Bandeira and Carlão. In October, she released her debut album, Bárbara, and the album included several singles released until then. She debuted at a festival, performing at Rock In Rio Lisboa in 2022.

Personal life
Tinoco listed Miguel Araújo, Suzanne Vega and Julia Michaels as some of her musical influences. She is a fan of the board game Catan.

Discography

Studio albums
 2021 – Bárbara

EP
 2021 – Desalinhados

Singles
 2019 – Antes dela dizer que sim
 2019 – A fugir de ser
 2019 – Sei lá
 2020 – Se o mundo acabar
 2020 – Outras línguas
 2020 – Um Natal Unibanco
 2021 – Cidade (featuring Bárbara Bandeira)
 2022 – Eu te amo (featuring Lagum)
 2022 – Chamada não atendida

References 

1998 births
Living people
Singers from Lisbon
21st-century Portuguese women singers
Portuguese women singer-songwriters
English-language singers from Portugal